Nina Willner is an American nonfiction author, a former intelligence officer and human rights activist. Her first book Forty Autumns A Family’s Story of Courage and Survival on Both Sides of the Berlin Wall (HarperCollins William Morrow, 2016) is the true story of Willner's mother's escape from communist East Germany at age 20, the large family she left behind the Iron Curtain, and their four-decade journey to reunite. During the Cold War, Willner, then a 22-year-old U.S. Army intelligence officer, was sent into the heart of Soviet-controlled East Berlin to lead secret spy missions. Willner uses her personal story to tell the broader story of the Cold War and the fall of communism in Eastern Europe.

Forty Autumns was named “Top 15 Nonfiction Books of 2016” by Christian Science Monitor and Kirkus Reviews praised it as a book that “celebrates the resilience of the human spirit.” The book has been sold in the US, UK, Germany, Poland, Hungary, Holland, Slovakia, Brazil and China.

Biography 
Willner grew up mostly in Falls Church, VA. Her father Eddie Willner, a Jewish Auschwitz and Buchenwald survivor, emigrated to the U.S. after WWII and served a career in the U.S. Army. Her mother, Johanna Willner, is a teacher. Willner has five siblings. She is Jewish. 

Willner began her career in Berlin. After a career in U.S. intelligence, she worked in the fields of human rights and rule of law, in education and for women’s and children’s charity causes. She has spent three decades living and working for the U.S Government, for non-profits and humanitarian outreach programs in Russia, Belarus, Czech Republic, Germany, Japan, Canada and in Turkey.

References 

 “15 Best Nonfiction Books of 2016,” The Christian Science Monitor, Dec 20, 2016  
 “11 Works of Nonfiction to Rival Any Great Thriller Novel,” by Keith Rice, Signature, Aug 17, 2018  
 “New memoirs trace identity, exile and exclusion in Germany, Latvia and India,” by Diane Scharper, National Catholic Reporter, Dec 6, 2017  
 “Forty Autumns: The Perfect Christmas Gift for Millennials Tempted by Marxism,” by John Zmirak, The Stream, Dec 6, 2017 
 “Forty Years of Family Life Lost Behind the Iron Curtain,” by Giulia Rhodes, The Guardian, Oct 8, 2016 
 “The Sadness of Partisan Polarizing,” by Loretta G. Breuning Ph.D., Psychology Today, Feb 7, 2017  
 “18 Books You Should Read this October,” by Bethanne Patrick, Literary Hub, Oct 4, 2016 
 “A Year of Reading: My Favourite Books of 2016,” by Bob Douglas, Critics At Large, Jan 7, 2017 
 “Eddie Willner: A Survivor,” by Nina Willner, USO On Patrol, Sep 19, 2015 
 “Nonfiction: Forty Autumns,” by Rebecca Hill, Library Journal (starred review) Sep 15, 2016  
 “Forty Autumns,” Publishers Weekly  
 “Forty Autumns,” Kirkus Reviews, Aug 15, 2016 
 “Book: Forty Autumns,” by Roger Bishop, BookPage, Oct 5, 2016 
 “Forty Autumns: A powerful family history covering both sides of the Berlin Wall,” by Julia M. Klein, The Chicago Tribune, Oct 7, 2016  
 “Editorial Content,” by Alexis Burling, BookReporter
 “Biography and Memoir,” by Julia McMichael, Manhattan Book Review 
 “Brings the Cold War to Life,” Booklist 
 “The Iron Curtain Rises Again,” by Maureen McCarthy, Star Tribune, Nov 11, 2016 
 “Western girl's emotional journey east to adulthood,” by Marina Gerner, The Jewish Chronicle, Dec 1, 2016 
 “A Rare Perspective,” by LTG (Ret.) Thomas Griffin, Oct 7, 2016

External links 

  
 Forty Autumns, HarperCollins site  
 Appearances  
 Harper Collins Speakers Bureau  
 HarperAcademic Podcast

1961 births
Living people
20th-century American women writers
21st-century American women writers
American women non-fiction writers
20th-century American non-fiction writers
21st-century American non-fiction writers
American intelligence analysts
American human rights activists
Women human rights activists
Activists from Virginia
Writers from Virginia
James Madison University alumni
American people of German-Jewish descent